Mohammad Baqer Majlesi  (b. 1037/1628-29 – d. 1110/1699) ( Allameh Majlesi; also Romanized as: Majlessi, Majlisi, Madjlessi), known as Allamah Majlesi or Majlesi Al-Thani (Majlesi the Second), was an influential Iranian Twelver Shia scholar and thinker during the Safavid era. He has been described as "one of the most powerful and influential Shi'a ulema of all time", whose "policies and actions reoriented Twelver Shia'ism in the direction that it was to develop from his day on."

He was buried next to his father in a family mausoleum located next to the Jamé Mosque of Isfahan.

Early life and education
Born in Isfahan in 1617, his father, Mulla Mohammad Taqi Majlesi (Majlesi-ye Awwal—Majlesi the First, 1594 AD-1660 AD), was a cleric of Islamic jurisprudence. The genealogy of his family is traced back to Abu Noaym Ahámad b. Abdallah Esfahani (d. 1038 AD), the author, inter alia, of a History of Isfahan, entitled Zikr-i akhbar-i Isfahan.

By the age of 25, he gained certification of "riwāyat" from Mulla Sadra to teach. He is said to have completed studies under 21 masters (ustadh). He is reported to have trained 181 students to become masters themselves.

Influence and beliefs
In 1687, the Safavid King, Sultan Husayn, appointed Majlesi as "Sheikh ul-Islam" (Chief Religious Leader of the land) in Isfahan, the capital of the Persian Empire. In this influential position, he was given a free hand by the Sultan to encourage and to punish as he saw fit. "The three inter-related areas in which Majlisi exerted his efforts were": the suppression of Sufism, mystical philosophies, philosophic views known as Falsafah that he claimed were contrary to Islam and "the suppression of Sunnism and other religious groups."

According to scholar Moojan Momen, Majlisi's era marked a breaking point, as he successfully undercut the influence of Sufism and philosophic rationalism in Shiism. "Up to the time of Majlisi, Shiism and Sufism were closely linked and indeed Sufism had been a vehicle for pro-Shii sentiment among the Sunnis. Even the most eminent members of the Shii ulama in the preceding centuries had come under the influence of Sufiism." After the death of Majlisi, "this process continued among the succeeding generations of ulama" so that Sufism became "divorced from Shiism and ceased to influence the main stream of Shii development. Philosophy was also down-graded and ceased to be an important part of studies at the religious colleges."

Legalism
He also reestablished clerical authority under his leadership, "and renewed the impetus for conversion from Sunni to Shi'a school." Majlesi is "credited with propagating numerous Shi'a rituals that Iranians regularly practice", such as mourning ceremonies for the fallen Twelve Imams, particularly the martyrdom of Husayn ibn Ali at Karbala, and pilgrimages to shrines of imams and their families.

Majlesi "fervently upheld the concepts of 'enjoining the good' and 'prohibiting evil, and in so doing endeavoured to provide fatwa (judgements) for "all of the hypothetical situations a true believer could or might face." In one "exposition of virtues of proper behavior", he gave directions on everything from how to "wear clothes to sexual intercourse and association with females, clipping fingernails, sleeping, waking, urination and defecation, enemas, sneezing, entering and leaving a domicile, and treatments and cures for many illnesses and diseases."

More controversially, Majlesi defined "science" very narrowly as "knowledge of the clear, secure ayat; of the religious duties and obligations which God has fixed in His Justice; and of the Prophetic Traditions (Hadith), which are valid until the day of Resurrection." Beyond this, he warned, the seeking of knowledge is "a waste of one's life," and worse would "generally lead to apostasy and heresy, in which case the likelihood of salvation is remote." He opposed the school of mystical philosophy developed by Mir Damad and Mulla Sadra, who argued that the Quran was always open to reinterpretation, and valued insights that came from intuition and ecstasy rather than reason.

Work and contribution
Allamah Al-Majlisi's most important field of interest was the hadith. He popularized his teaching by writing numerous works in an easily understandable style, in which he summarized the essential doctrines for the common people. Allamah Majlisi was also a very prolific writer. He wrote more than 100 books, both in Arabic and Persian. Some of his more famous works are:

Bihar al-Anwar ("Seas of Light") in 110 volumes.
Reality of Certainty
Mirror of Intellects, a 26-volume commentary.
Shelter of the Upright People, a 16-volume commentary.
Provisions for the Hereafter
A Gift for the Pilgrims
Essence of Life
Adornment of the Pious
Al-Fara'edh al-Tarifah

See also
Safavid conversion of Iran to Shia Islam
Du'a al-Kumayl
Sharif al-Murtaza
Al-Sharif al-Radi
Al-Shaykh Al-Mufid
Shaykh Tusi
ibn Babawayh
Muhammad ibn Ya'qub al-Kulayni
Amina Bint al-Majlisi
Al-Hurr al-Aamili
Aliqoli Jadid-ol-Eslam

References

Further reading

External links
Bio of the Majlesi family
Encyclopaedia Iranica, MAJLESI, Mohammad-Baqer
http://www.al-islam.org/al-tawhid/hadith-science/1.htm

Shia clerics from Isfahan
Hadith compilers
Safavid theologians
1627 births
1699 deaths
17th-century Iranian writers
17th-century Muslim scholars of Islam
Critics of Sunni Islam
Burials in Isfahan